Corollospora is a genus of fungi in the Halosphaeriaceae family. The genus contains 19 species.

References

External links
Corollospora at Index Fungorum

Microascales